Jaco Janse van Vuuren is a paralympic athlete from South Africa competing mainly in category F37 long jump and javelin events.

Jaco first competed in the 1996 Summer Paralympics in the F34-37 long jump and winning a bronze medal in the F36 javelin.  He returned in 2000 but was unable to medal in the javelin but did win a silver in the F37 long jump; he also competed as part of the South African 4 × 100 m team.

References

Paralympic athletes of South Africa
Athletes (track and field) at the 1996 Summer Paralympics
Athletes (track and field) at the 2000 Summer Paralympics
Paralympic silver medalists for South Africa
Paralympic bronze medalists for South Africa
Living people
Medalists at the 1996 Summer Paralympics
Medalists at the 2000 Summer Paralympics
Year of birth missing (living people)
Paralympic medalists in athletics (track and field)
South African male long jumpers
South African male javelin throwers
20th-century South African people
21st-century South African people